Farrel Arya Tri Sandika Supratikno (born 1 July 2002) is an Indonesian professional footballer who plays as a forward for Liga 1 club PSIS Semarang.

Club career

PSIS Semarang
He was signed for PSIS Semarang to play in Liga 1 in the 2021 season. He made a special debut in the match against Persikabo 1973 in the 2021 Menpora Cup tournament. Apart from getting the chance to play from the first minute, Farrel also got his name on the scoreboard. Farrel made his professional debut in the league on 17 February 2023 in a match against Persis Solo at the Jatidiri Stadium, Semarang.

Career statistics

Club

References

External links
 F. Arya at Soccerway

2002 births
Living people
Indonesian footballers
Association football forwards
Liga 1 (Indonesia) players
PSIS Semarang players
Sportspeople from Central Java